Blue crab may refer to:
 Blue Crab 11, an American sailboat design
 Callinectes sapidus – Chesapeake or Atlantic blue crab of the West Atlantic, introduced elsewhere
 Cardisoma guanhumi – blue land crab of the West Atlantic
 Discoplax celeste – blue land crab of Christmas Island
 Paralithodes platypus – blue king crab of the North Pacific
 Portunus pelagicus – blue swimmer crab of Australia and Southwest Pacific
 Portunus segnis - an Atlantic species, was recently recorded in Tunisian waters, where it is invasive
 Portunus trituberculatus – Japanese blue crab of the Northwest Pacific